Theodoxus maresi is a species of small freshwater snail with an operculum, an aquatic gastropod mollusk in the family Neritidae the nerites.

Distribution
This species is found in Algeria and Morocco. The type locality is Aïn Khadra, near Zerguin, in north-eastern Algeria.

Description 
The length of the shell is 8 mm.

References

Neritidae
Gastropods described in 1864
Taxonomy articles created by Polbot